The first Armenians in Burma arrived in 1612, and dwelt in Syriam, the first tombstone being dated 1725. They were merchants.

History
Armenians were deported in large numbers to New Julfa, on the outskirts of Isfahan (Persia), early in the seventeenth century. Many continued on to South and Southeast Asia in the eighteenth century as conditions turned against them in Persia. By the 19th century they were to be found chiefly in Burma, the Malay peninsula (particularly Penang and Malacca), and Java. They tended to emigrate further from around World War I, notably to Australia.

In Burma, major Armenian traders were employed as officials by the Burmese kings, especially in charge of customs and relations with foreigners. They survived the First Burmese War in 1826, when the British annexed Arakan and Tenasserim, but the British conquest of Lower Burma, the commercial heart of the country, in 1852, led to renewed accusations (from the British) that Armenian merchants were anti-British, and even pro-Russian. Nevertheless, the Armenians of Yangon built their church in 1862, on land presented to them by the King of Burma.

The 1871-1872 Census of British India revealed that there were 1,250 Armenians, chiefly in Kolkata, Dhaka and Yangon. The 1881 Census stated the figure to be 1,308; 737 in Bengal and 466 in Burma. By 1891, the total figure was 1,295. The 1901 Census of British India stated that there were 256 Armenians in Burma.

The only Armenian Apostolic Church still active is St. John the Baptist in Yangon.

Notable Armenians of Burma
Thackers Indian Directory lists many Armenian language names in Burmese business and government. The Sarkies Brothers (a group of four Armenian brothers, best known for founding a chain of hotels throughout Southeast Asia) first opened the Eastern & Oriental Hotel in Penang in 1884 before expanding their business to the Raffles Hotel in Singapore and The Strand Hotel in Yangon in 1901. Many Armenians remaining in Burma might also be considered part of the Anglo-Indian or, more correctly, the Anglo-Burmese community. Another famous Burmese Armenian is Diana Abgar.

References

Further reading

Margaret Sarkissian,  'Armenians in South-East Asia', (1987) 3 Crossroads, an Interdisciplinary Journal of Southeast Asian Studies, 1-33.
Roy, A and Lahiri-Roy, R. 'The Armenian Diaspora's Calcutta connection, (2017) 10, Diaspora studies,137-151.

K. S. Papazian,  Merchants from Ararat, a brief survey of Armenian trade through the ages, (New York: Ararat Press 1979)
Denys Lombard and Jean Aubin, (eds), Asian merchants and businessmen in the Indian Ocean and the China Sea, (New Delhi: Oxford University Press 2000).
Nadia H Wright, Respected citizens: The history of Armenians in Singapore and Malaysia, (Ammasia Publishing,  2003)
Vahé Baladouni and Margaret Makepeace, (eds), Armenian Merchants of the Seventeenth and Early Eighteenth Centuries: English East India Company Sources, (Philadelphia: American Philosophical Society, 1998) 294 pp (the index at pages 281-283 lists about 100 Armenian merchants by name).
Ilsa Sharp, There Is Only One Raffles, The Story of a Grand Hotel (Souvenir Press Ltd. 1981)
 Andrew Whitehead article for BBC News website August 2014 on Myanmar's last Armenians https://www.bbc.co.uk/news/magazine-28867884
GE Harvey, History of Burma: From the Earliest Times to 10 March 1824 (1925) p 346.

See also
Armenian diaspora

Myanmar
Ethnic groups in Myanmar